Cloud Computing (foaled April 29, 2014) is an American Thoroughbred racehorse who won the 2017 Preakness Stakes in only his fourth start.

Background

Cloud Computing was bred in Kentucky by Hill 'n' Dale Equine Holdings and Stretch Run Ventures. He is from the first foal crop sired by Maclean's Music, a son of Distorted Humor. Maclean's Music was an impressive winner by  lengths in his only start, a 2011 race for three-year-old maiden horses. and based upon the performances of his first crop of foals, exceeded expectations as a sire. Cloud Computing's dam is Quick Temper, a multiple stakes-placed daughter of A.P. Indy.

Cloud Computing was purchased as a yearling at the 2015 Keeneland Sales for $200,000 by Seth Klarman, the owner of Klaravich Stables, and William Lawrence. Introduced by mutual friends in 2004, the two typically buy about 50–60 horses a year. Both hedge fund managers, they chose his name based upon their pattern of using terms from the finance industry to name their horses, other examples being graded stakes winners Takeover Target and Currency Swap.

He is trained by Chad C. Brown.

Racing career

Cloud Computing did not make his racing debut until February 11, 2017, when, as a three-year-old, he won a maiden special weight at Aqueduct Racetrack. He then finished second to J Boys Echo in the Gotham Stakes and third behind winner Irish War Cry in the Wood Memorial. He earned enough points from these races to qualify on the 2017 Road to the Kentucky Derby.  However, his connections elected to bypass the race, instead starting their Champagne Stakes winner, Practical Joke, who finished fifth.

Cloud Computing was one of the more highly regarded "new shooters" for the Preakness Stakes, a race which is typically won by horses who had earlier raced in the Kentucky Derby. The two favorites in the Preakness, Always Dreaming and Classic Empire, had finished first and fourth respectively in the Derby. These two went to an early lead and set a solid pace while Cloud Computing rated a few lengths behind in third. Around the final turn, Classic Empire surged to the front and Always Dreaming dropped back. In mid-stretch, Classic Empire had a three-length lead and looked the likely winner before Cloud Computing angled out from traffic and started closing ground rapidly. Classic Empire tried to rally but could not hold off Cloud Computing, who won by a head.

Cloud Computing became just the fourth horse in the last 34 years to win the Preakness after not having raced in the Derby. The last horse to do so was the filly Rachel Alexandra in 2009. It was the first win of a Triple Crown race for his trainer Chad Brown and the second for jockey Javier Castellano, who was riding the colt for the first time.

"I'm not going to dispute the fact that I brought in a fresh horse as part of our strategy", said Brown. "Classic Empire and Always Dreaming are two outstanding horses and our strategy was, if we were going to ever beat them, let's take them on two weeks' rest when we have six, and it worked."

"It's incredibly special", said Klarman. "He's a great horse. I have the best trainer and the best jockey going for me. I never imagined it, but I'm thrilled." Klarman had grown up in Baltimore just a few blocks away from Pimlico and attended many runnings of the Preakness including Secretariat's win in 1973.

Cloud Computing was then given some time off before finishing fifth in the Jim Dandy Stakes at Saratoga on July 29. He followed up with a ninth-place finish in the Travers Stakes on August 26.

Statistics

Pedigree

References

2014 racehorse births
Racehorses bred in Kentucky
Racehorses trained in the United States
Thoroughbred family 8-g
Preakness Stakes winners
American Grade 1 Stakes winners